Blue Zoo is a 2014 Australian children's television reality television series broadcast on ABC3 in Australia and TRTÉ in Ireland. During six weeks of production, eight teenage "rookies" work with marine animals at Dolphin Marine Magic in Coffs Harbour in order to become marine experts.

Production 
500 teenagers from Australia and Ireland auditioned to become "rookies" on the show. Blue Zoo was filmed at the Dolphin Marine Magic marine park in Coffs Harbour from October to November 2013. The show first aired in Australia on ABC3 in 2014.

Cast

International Broadcast

References

External links 
 Blue Zoo website
Dolphin Marine Conseveration Park, Coffs Harbour

2014 Australian television series debuts
2014 Australian television series endings
Australian Broadcasting Corporation original programming
Australian children's television series
Television shows set in New South Wales